Ryslinge is a town with a population of 1,768 (1 January 2022) in central Denmark, located in Faaborg-Midtfyn Municipality on the island of Funen.

Ryslinge Folk High School is located in the town.

External links
 Ryslinge.NET Listing of Businesses based in Ryslinge (Danish Only)

References

Cities and towns in the Region of Southern Denmark
Faaborg-Midtfyn Municipality